Museum Campus is a  park in Chicago that sits alongside Lake Michigan in Grant Park and encompasses five of the city's most notable attractions: the Adler Planetarium, America's first planetarium; the Shedd Aquarium; the Field Museum of Natural History; Soldier Field, home of the NFL Chicago Bears football team; and the Lakeside Center of McCormick Place. Museum Campus sits adjacent to Northerly Island along the waterfront.

History
The Museum Campus was created to transform the vicinity of three of the city's most notable museums – the Adler Planetarium, the Shedd Aquarium, and the Field Museum of Natural History – along with Soldier Field stadium, into a scenic pedestrian-friendly area. The area is landscaped with greenery and flora as well as jogging paths and walkways. A picturesque promenade along Solidarity Drive, an isthmus, links Northerly Island to the mainland. The drive itself is lined with a number of grand bronze monuments commemorating Kościuszko, Havliček, and Nicholas Copernicus, the last of which is a replica of a famous 19th-century work in Warsaw by Danish sculptor Bertel Thorvaldsen.

The Museum Campus opened on June 4, 1998, when the northbound lanes of Lake Shore Drive were moved west of Soldier Field following the route of the expressway's southbound lanes. By removing the roadway which bisected the area, Museum Campus was created into a green space for the enjoyment of both residents and tourists.  In 2014, a consortium of museums in or near the University of Chicago, formed Museum Campus South. Also in 2014, filmmaker George Lucas selected Museum Campus as the location of the Lucas Museum of Narrative Art, which would have cost an estimated $700 million, and expanded Museum Campus south along the city's waterfront. However, these plans were canceled in June 2016 due to opposition from the Friends of the Parks advocacy group.

In August 2016, in a partnership with the City of Chicago, the Chicago Parks District and Everywhere Wireless, Museum Campus joined many Chicago Beaches and Buckingham Fountain in providing free Wi-Fi to visitors.

In celebration of the 2018 Illinois Bicentennial, the Museum Campus was selected as one of the Illinois 200 Great Places  by the American Institute of Architects Illinois component (AIA Illinois).

Campus Museums

See also

 List of museums and cultural institutions in Chicago

References

External links
 Museum Campus map
 View on Google Maps — includes a short video

Museum Campus
Society of Architectural Historians SAH ARCHIPEDIA entry on Museum Campus

 
Parks in Chicago
Chicago, Museum Campus
1998 establishments in Illinois
Neighborhoods in Chicago